The Western Fleet is a Naval fleet of the Indian Navy. It is known as the 'Sword Arm' of the Indian Navy. It is headquartered at Mumbai, Maharashtra on the west coast of India. It is a part of the Western Naval Command and is responsible for the naval forces in the Arabian Sea and parts of the Indian Ocean.

The Western Fleet was formally constituted on 1 March 1968. The Fleet is commanded by a Two Star Flag Officer of the rank of Rear Admiral with the title Flag Officer Commanding Western Fleet (FOCWF). Rear Admiral Vineet McCarty is the current FOCWF, who took over on 15 November 2022. The current flagship of the Western Fleet is the aircraft carrier .

History
After the independence and the partition of India on 15 August 1947, the ships and personnel of the Royal Indian Navy were divided between the Dominion of India and the Dominion of Pakistan. The division of the ships was on the basis of two-thirds of the fleet to India, one third to Pakistan.

This was then called the Indian Fleet. After her commissioning in 1948, HMIS Delhi (later called INS Delhi) became the Flagship of the Indian Fleet. The Fleet commander was styled as Flag Officer Commanding Indian Fleet (FOCIF). 
In 1956, Rear Admiral Ram Dass Katari became the first Indian flag officer, and was appointed the first Indian Commander of the Fleet on 2 October, when he took over from Rear Admiral Sir St John Tyrwhitt. In 1957, INS Mysore was commissioned and the flag of Rear Adm Katari was transferred from INS Delhi to INS Mysore, thus becoming the flagship of the Indian Fleet.

The first Aircraft carrier of the Indian Navy,  was commissioned in 1961 and became the flagship of the Indian Fleet.

On 1 March 1968, the Eastern Naval Command was established and the Indian Fleet was renamed as the Western Fleet.

Indo-Pakistani War of 1971
At the outbreak of war, the Western Fleet was commanded by Rear Admiral E C Kuruvilla, PVSM, AVSM. In mid 1971, The Aircraft carrier , along with the frigates INS Brahmaputra and INS Beas were moved from the Western Fleet to the Eastern Naval Command. Due to this, INS Mysore, once again, became the flagship of the Western Fleet.

According to Admiral Sourendra Nath Kohli, the then Commander-in-Chief Western Naval Command,
"The Western Fleet was given a broad directive to seek and destroy enemy warships, protect our merchant shipping, deny sealanes to enemy shipping and render ineffective the maritime line of communication between West Pakistan and East Pakistan to prevent any reinforcements from reaching the beleaguered Pakistani forces at that end."

ORBAT
The Order of Battle of the Western Fleet in 1971 was:
Fleet Commander: Rear Admiral Elenjikal Chandy Kuruvila
 Flag Ship INS Mysore - Captain R K S Gandhi, VrC
 15th Frigate Squadron
 INS Trishul - Captain K M V Nair, VrC 
 INS Talwar - Commander S S Kumar, VrC
 14th Frigate Squadron
 INS Khukri - Captain Mahendra Nath Mulla, MVC
 INS Kirpan - Commander R R Sood, VrC, NM
 INS Kuthar - Commander U C Tripathi, NM
 31 Patrol Squadron
Patrol Vessels
 INS Kiltan - Commander K P Gopal Rao, MVC, VSM
 INS Katchall - Commander K N Zadu, VrC
 INS Kadmatt - Commander S Jain, NM
Frigates
 INS Cauvery - Commander I K Erry
 INS Kistna - Commander R A J Anderson
 INS Tir - Commander M Pratap
Destroyer
 INS Ranjit - Commander R N Singh
Submarines
 INS Karanj - Commander Vijai Singh Shekhawat, VrC
 INS Kursura - Commander Arun Auditto, NM
 OSA Class Patrol Boats
25 K Squadron - Commander Babru Bhan Yadav, MVC

251K Division
 INS Nashak - Lieutenant Commander R B Suri
 INS Nipat - Lieutenant Commander B N Kavina, VrC
 INS Nirghat - Lieutenant Commander J Sharma, AVSM, VrC
 INS Nirbhik - Lieutenant Commander S Issac
252 K Division
 INS Vijeta - Commander A K Parti
 INS Vinash - Lieutenant Commander V Jerath, VrC
 INS Veer - Lieutenant Commander O P Mehta, VrC, NM
 INS Vidyut - Lieutenant Commander B B Singh

Operation Trident & Operation Python

On 4 December, the fleet successfully executed Operation Trident, a devastating attack on the Pakistan Naval Headquarters at Karachi that sank a minesweeper, a destroyer and an ammunition supply ship. The attack also irreparably damaged another destroyer and oil storage tanks at the Karachi port. To commemorate this, 4 December is celebrated as the Navy Day. This was followed by Operation Python on 8 December 1971, further deprecating the Pakistan Navy's capabilities.

Kargil War
The Indian Navy launched Operation Talwar on 25 May 1999. The entire Western Fleet had sailed from Mumbai to the North Arabian Sea to increase surveillance and adopt a deterrent posture. Elements of the Eastern Fleet joined the Western Fleet in the Arabian Sea later. The joint Western and Eastern Fleets blockaded the Pakistani ports (primarily the Karachi port). They began aggressive patrols and threatened to cut Pakistan's sea trade. This exploited Pakistan's dependence on sea-based oil and trade flows. Later, then-Prime Minister of Pakistan, Nawaz Sharif disclosed that Pakistan was left with just six days of fuel to sustain itself if a full-scale war had broken out.

Fleet Commander

The Fleet Commander is titled Flag Officer Commanding Western Fleet (FOCWF).
The appointment has been known by several titles since 1947:
 1947 - 1951 - Commodore Commanding Indian Naval Squadron (COMINS)
 1951 - 1952 - Rear Admiral Commanding Indian Naval Squadron (RACINS)
 1952 - 1957 - Flag Officer Commanding (Flotillas) Indian Fleet (FOCFIF)
 1957 - 1968 - Flag Officer Commanding Indian Fleet (FOCIF)
 1968–present - Flag Officer Commanding Western Fleet (FOCWF)

See also
 Western Naval Command
 Flag Officer Commanding Western Fleet
 Eastern Fleet

References

Indian Navy
Naval units and formations of India